Incident at a Corner is an episode of the TV series Startime which aired April 5, 1960. It was directed by Alfred Hitchcock.

Cast
George Peppard
Vera Miles
Paul Hartman

References

External links

Incident at a Corner at BFI

1960 American television episodes